Robert Allen Coombes (1882–1949) represents a very rare example of a child murdering his mother. The murder went undetected for ten days and became a sensation when discovered in the hot summer of 1895 in the East End of London. The event became known as the Plaistow Horror. Contemporary descriptions suggest Robert seems to have had no moral compass, and was involved in many financial tricks, before turning to murder. He escaped the hangman's noose due to his age.

Robert was one of the only male prisoners in Holloway Prison and the youngest ever inmate of Broadmoor. Despite his horrific crimes he was released and lived a long and productive life in Australia thereafter, being considered rehabilitated.

Life
He was born in Bethnal Green in London on 6 January 1882 the first son of Robert Coombes and his wife Emily Harrison Coombes (née Allen) who had married in 1878. His father was a steward on a transatlantic steamer "France" and was often away from home for prolonged periods. Robert was a forceps birth and had visible marks on each temple.
He was baptised in April 1882, but the parents' surname was recorded as Allen instead of Coombes.    Allen was Robert's mother's maiden name.  Their address was 28 Edward Street, and the father's occupation was 'butcher.'

His brother Nathaniel George Coombes was born in February the following year.

Robert had severe headaches from the age of around three years. The doctor advised never to strike him on the head. The family moved to Liverpool and stayed with relatives in 1885/6. Robert senior stayed in Liverpool until 1892 but Emily and the boys returned to London. Their doctor Dr Coward began prescribing Potassium bromide during the period of the father's absence.

Back in London in 1888 young Robert was exposed to the surrounding Whitechapel murders and Jack the Ripper and became obsessed with the cheap sensationalist papers known as the penny dreadfuls. This interest was not discouraged.

In the winter of 1891/2 the family moved to 35 Cave Road in the Plaistow district of London's east end. The boys attended Grange Road School under headmaster George Charles Hollamby. Robert was described as exceptionally clever. He moved to Stock Street School under Jesse Smith in 1893. They later moved to Cave Street School in July 1894 under Charles Struler. At the latter the headmaster was told that his absence from 12 September 1894 until 11 March 1895 was due to a "sea voyage". At the trial his father explained this was a trip to New York. Nevertheless, there was repeated truancy but he was thought a good pupil and very clever.

The school leaving age was then 11 years. Robert left school in June 1895 and briefly worked with a plater in the dockyard.

In November 1894 (aged only 12) he had made complicated journeys alone to attend the trial of the murderer James Canham Read, the "Southend Murderer" (of Florence Dennis) at Chelmsford (Essex Assizes). As cashier of the Royal Albert Docks (where the father worked) and with young Coombes reputation for financial swindles it may be that his interest in this trial was more than macabre as he may well have known Read personally. Read was found guilty and hanged in December.

The murder

Both Robert and Nathaniel testified that Robert the younger had purchased the knife himself with the express intention of killing his mother, a week or so before the event at the Brett's shop at 273 Barking Road for the price of five pence. The knife was first hidden in a dustbin in the back yard then in an unused chimney in the house.

Robert the elder had left the family, as per his usual pattern, late on Friday or early on Saturday 6 July 1895, and left sufficient cash to last until his expected return. The boys were getting older and were starting to misbehave.

On Sunday 7 July Emily had beaten Nathaniel and he told Robert that he wanted to kill her. That night, around 3.45am on the Monday morning, Robert stabbed his mother in the heart twice as she lay in bed, having first struck her on the head with a truncheon. Robert (who had slept in his mother's room) seemingly went back to sleep. Between 8.30 and 9am on the Monday he went to Nathaniel's room and told him that he had killed their mother. Nathaniel did not believe this and asked to see. Court evidence states the mother was still groaning in agony at 9am. They covered her head and went out.

The Period between Murder and Discovery

Robert took a gold sovereign from his mother's purse on Monday morning and asked the neighbour James William Robertson at 33 Cave Road for change of the coin. He gave two half sovereigns in exchange and they gave him one and their mother's rent book asking him to pay their rent (7 shillings a week which was due every Monday) as their mother was away. He agreed. Robert returned at 7pm to collect his 3 shillings change.

Later that day (and the day after) Robert used the remaining half sovereign and he and Nathaniel went to Lord's Cricket Ground to see the famous W. G. Grace play cricket as part of his "golden summer" of centuries. On the Tuesday evening Robert (in a highly organised way) put quicklime on his mother's body to control the decay.

On the Wednesday Robert contacted 39 year old John Fox at the Royal Albert Dock where Fox did odd-jobs for the National Steamship Company. Fox (who was mentally challenged) had been a seaman on the "Egypt" but following a fire and loss of the ship had become too scared to go to sea again and did works in the dock area instead. Fox was a friend of his father and the two had probably worked together. Young Robert asked Fox to look after them while his mother was "away" and to pawn items from the house (including his father's gold pocket watch) at George Fish's pawn shop at 545 Commercial Road in Poplar. Fox claimed to be Robert Coombes senior and got 10 shillings for the gold watch. He then went to a second pawn shop at 554 Commercial Road and pawned Coombes' silver watch and then a third at 2/4 High Street Plaistow where he pawned a mandolin. Fox then came to stay with the boys, all sleeping in the lower rooms for the period. 
 
On one night (probably the Friday) the boys went to the Stratford Theatre while Fox stayed alone in the house. The boys played cricket with Fox in the back yard on most evenings of the week in question.

On Saturday 13 July, John Fox went to John Hewson the Cashier of the National Steamship Company with a letter allegedly from Robert Coombes junior, saying his mother was very ill with Bright's Disease and had a heavy doctor's bill to pay. It requested that Hewson advanced the family £4 from their father's pay in order to pay this bill. Hewson requested a doctor's certificate. On Monday 15 July young Robert went to Hewson himself, with a letter alleging to be from J. J. Griffin, the local physician, confirming the mother's illness. This was of course a fabrication. Apparently two years earlier Robert had obtained £2 using a similar ruse. Hewson said he would come to their house to give his mother the money.

Neighbours were suspicious and the boys' story that Emily had gone to Liverpool did not make sense. The neighbour, Mrs Burridge, contacted Emily's sister-in-law, also Emily Coombes of 168 Bowling Road, to investigate. She attended on Monday 8 July but got no response. She returned at 6pm on Monday 15 July and Fox (whom she did not know) answered the door. She was again told Mrs Coombes was in Liverpool. She returned on Wednesday 17 July at 9am and got no response. Returning in early afternoon she knocked and this time got into the house and was met by the boys and Fox. The bedroom door was locked and there was a bad smell. She obtained a spare key from the landlord and returned to the house. Unlocking the door she was confronted by the decomposing body of her sister-in-law, covered in maggots. Neighbours had noted many flies but had not noted any smell but this was put down to the proximity of much manure in nearby market gardens.

The neighbour Mrs Burridge (who was also in the house) went to her own house and got her husband to run for the police and Constable Robert Thwart came at 1.50pm. Nathaniel had escaped through a window during the event. Another neighbour Mrs Hayward of 39 Cave Road replaced the earlier Mrs Burridge. More police arrived including Sergeant Henry Balch who took Fox's statement. Robert and John Fox were arrested at the scene and held in the police cells at West Ham. He only left (with them) at the arrival of Divisional Police Surgeon Alfred Kennedy then attended the scene and removed the body. He described the head as "horribly decomposed". The bedsheets were covered in dried blood. The blood covered knife still lay nearby. He was later joined by Sergeant Charles Orpwood who made detailed plans of the house and murder scene.

Police Inspector George Gilbert spent most of that evening and the next morning at the house. He found a boy's flannel shirt covered in blood-stains. The bedroom where the murder had taken place had been ransacked by Robert and the contents of the drawers were strewn around the room. He appeared to have been looking for more valuables to sell. Disturbingly he also found a letter from Robert to his father, not apologising for his crime, but contriving a complicated story about mother injuring her hand and not being able to write, and could he send money to cover various bills. There was an unsent advert to a local newspaper from young Robert, seeking a private loan of £30 in return for six monthly repayments of £6. The rent book was there showing the 7 shilling payment on 8 July, after the mother's death.

Trial and Imprisonment

Robert was moved to Holloway Prison on July 18 and remained there until the trial. He was observed by the Medical Officer, George Edward Walker, who on 10 August, on advice from the guards, moved him to a padded cell for his own safety. He told Walker he heard voices telling him to kill his mother and he had an "irresistible impulse to kill her". Walker noted that the pupils of his eyes would wander unequally during his headaches and noted the unusual scars from his forceps birth. Walker reported that the boy was greatly excited (in a positive way) regarding his forthcoming trial, and seemed to view this with glee. However he started to cry when he thought about missing his cats, and his mandolin.

The trial began at the Old Bailey on 9 September 1895. The jury were told to focus on the mental health of the boy. The prosecution was led by two famous barristers: Horace Avory and Guy Stephenson.

Robert's own letter to a neighbour was read out: "Dear Mr Shaw, I received your letter on last Tuesday. I think I will get hung but I do not care as long as I get a good breakfast before they hang me. If they do not hang me I think I will commit suicide. That will do just as well. I will strangle myself. I hope you are all well. I go up on Monday to the Old Bailey to be tried. I hope you will be there. I think they will sentence me to die. If they do I will call all the witnesses liars. I remain, yours affectionately R A Coombes". There followed two schoolboy sketches: firstly a figure being pushed towards a scaffold; secondly his own self on the scaffold being hanged with a bubble at his mouth saying "goodbye". It then continued as a "will" leaving thousands of pounds to various people.
 
The family doctor John Joseph Griffin testified that Robert had a history of headaches. There was no evidence to suggest a history of insanity, but the mother was described as nervous and hysterical. Robert was too young to hang in any case. Robert was concluded to be a homicidal maniac with lucid periods, and under influence of pernicious literature.

The court debated the nature of insanity and the understanding of right and wrong, especially in children. The prior purchase of the knife clearly indicated premeditation, but this might be argued as also done during a period of mania. Ultimately it was simpler to conclude him insane or temporarily insane. The medical evidence concluded he was wholly sane but lacked all moral understanding.

He was found guilty and sentenced to an indefinite period in Broadmoor Hospital for the Criminally Insane as its youngest inmate. Nathaniel was found not guilty. Despite Fox pawning the Coombes goods, no guilt was found on his part.

Robert was released in 1912 after serving 17 years, aged 30.

Later life
Early in 1914 he emigrated to Australia where Nathaniel had gone during Robert's imprisonment. He enlisted in the Australian Imperial Force early in the First World War and won the Military Medal in October 1916 for conspicuous bravery as a stretcher-bearer during the Gallipoli Campaign.

After the war he worked on a farm at Nana Glen and taught music in the surrounding area of New South Wales. He then started his own market garden in the Glenreagh district.

Nathaniel was Chief Stoker on HMAS Australia in the First World War. and died in Newcastle, New South Wales in 1946.

Robert died at Coffs Harbour Hospital on 7 May 1949 aged 67. He never married. He is buried in Coffs Harbour Historic Cemetery, NSW.

References

1882 births
1948 deaths
People from Bethnal Green
British murderers
Minors convicted of murder
Matricides
1895 murders in the United Kingdom